Anid Travančić (born 30 September 1993) is a Bosnian professional footballer who plays as an attacking midfielder for NK Vis Simm-Bau.

Club career
He started playing in the youth team of a minor club, NK Borac Jelah, from where he moved to Croatia and joined the youth team of NK Zagreb. Then, after a short come-back to Bosnia where he played with Čelik Zenica, he played with other Croatian youth teams, namely, of the giants HNK Hajduk Split, and of Dinamo Zagreb satellite club, NK Lokomotiva.

Then he returned again to Bosnia and Herzegovina and signed with Čelik Zenica, only that this time he was added to the senior squad and he made his senior debut in the 2011–12 Premier League of Bosnia and Herzegovina. He made two solid seasons with Čelik and in summer 2013 he was on the spotlights of many clubs from the region. The first one was Serbian former 1991 European and World champions Red Star Belgrade which brought him for trials, but he failed. After failing to sign with Red Star, he was brought by the Bosnian powerhouse FK Sarajevo, which was in the rise after recently being acquired by the Malaysian businessman and investor Vincent Tan and was strongly investing to form a strong side.

Travančić won with Sarajevo the 2013–14 Bosnian Cup, but the squad failed to achieve the desired exhibitions so the team went under total restoration. Travančić left Sarajevo and during the next season he played the first half with NK TOŠK Tešanj in the Second League of the Federation of Bosnia and Herzegovina, and the second half of the season with Proleter Teslić in the First League of the Republika Srpska. The two leagues he played that season are the two leagues forming the second level of the Bosnian league system.

In the summer of 2016, he signed a contract with Novi Pazar. He made his debut in the 2016–17 Serbian SuperLiga as a starter on July 30, 2016, in an away first-round game against Javor Ivanjica, which ended in a 1–1 draw. After Novi Pazar, Travančić also played for FK Radnički Niš and Austrian club SC Team Wiener Linien.

On 2 July 2019, Travančić returned to and signed a contract with TOŠK Tešanj. He played his first match since his return to TOŠK on 24 August 2019, in a 3–0 away league loss against FK Goražde. Only two months after returning to TOŠK, on 30 September 2019, Travančić left the club again after only playing in two of TOŠK's eight league games since the beginning of the season.

In February 2020, Travančić signed with NK Usora.

International career
Travančić made 10 appearances and scored 1 goal for the Bosnia and Herzegovina U17 national team. After the under-17 team, he made three appearances for the Bosnia and Herzegovina U19 national team in 2010.

Finally, from 2012 to 2013, Travančić played 2 times but did not score a goal for the U21 national team.

Honours

Player

Club
Sarajevo
Bosnian Cup: 2013–14

References

External links
Anid Travančić at Sofascore

1993 births
Living people
People from Tešanj
Bosnia and Herzegovina footballers
Bosnia and Herzegovina expatriate footballers
Bosnia and Herzegovina youth international footballers
Bosnia and Herzegovina under-21 international footballers
Association football midfielders
Premier League of Bosnia and Herzegovina players
First League of the Federation of Bosnia and Herzegovina players
Serbian SuperLiga players
NK Zagreb players
HNK Hajduk Split players
NK Lokomotiva Zagreb players
NK TOŠK Tešanj players
NK Čelik Zenica players
FK Sarajevo players
FK Proleter Teslić players
FK Novi Pazar players
FK Radnički Niš players
NK Vis Simm-Bau players
Bosnia and Herzegovina expatriate sportspeople in Croatia
Bosnia and Herzegovina expatriate sportspeople in Serbia
Bosnia and Herzegovina expatriate sportspeople in Austria
Expatriate footballers in Croatia
Expatriate footballers in Serbia
Expatriate footballers in Austria